John Fox (born 28 September 1940) is  a former Australian rules footballer who played with Geelong in the Victorian Football League (VFL).  Fox lived in Lismore on the Western Plains of Victoria whilst playing with Geelong where he was employed at Stachan & co, Woolbrokers and Stock and Station Agents. He later played and coached with the Lismore Football Club.

Notes

External links 		
		
		
		
		
		
		
Living people		
1940 births		
		
Australian rules footballers from New South Wales		
Geelong Football Club players